Lake Ilirney (Chukchi Элер-нэй) is a group of two lakes of Bilibinsky District, Chukotka Autonomous Okrug, Russia. Lake Tytyl lies 33 km to the east.

Etymology
The name originated in the Chukchi word Eler-nei, meaning "rocky island", after the island located in the middle of the northern lake (Verkhniy Ilirneygytgyn).

Geography
The lakes are located on the southern side of the Ilirney Range in the upper reaches of the Maly Anyuy River, 20 km from Ilirney town. Dvukh Tsirkov, the highest peak of the range rises to the north of the lake. 
River Ilirneyveyem flows to the east of it. Archaeological remains of the Neolithic have been found on the shores of the lake.

Southern Ilirney (Nizhniy Ilirneygytgyn) is a slightly larger lake located 8.5 km to the southwest of the northern lake. River Ilirneyveyem flows in and out of Southern Ilirney.

See also
List of lakes of Russia

References

External links
Lake Ilirney pictures
Illirney